Mictopsichia boliviae is a species of moth of the family Tortricidae. It is found in Bolivia.

The ground colour of the forewings is pale orange, preserved as diffuse costal blotches and spots in the dorso-median area. The subapical streak is orange yellow and the markings are olive brown. The hindwings are orange with pale brownish apical markings.

References

Moths described in 2009
Mictopsichia
Moths of South America
Taxa named by Józef Razowski